Bänziger, Baenziger is a Swiss German surname. Notable people with the surname include: 

Hugo Bänziger
Marlies Bänziger
Benno Bänziger, a co-founder of Electra Bicycle Company

See also
Ann Patton Baenziger Malone

German-language surnames
Surnames of Swiss origin